Saint-Hippolyte, also known as Saint-Hippolyte-de-la-Salanque, is a commune in the Pyrénées-Orientales department, Occitania, southern France.

Geography 
Saint-Hippolyte is located in the canton of La Côte Salanquaise and in the arrondissement of Perpignan.

Government and politics

Mayors

Population

See also
Communes of the Pyrénées-Orientales department

References

Communes of Pyrénées-Orientales